São Miguel do Gostoso (previously known as São Miguel de Touros) is a municipality in the state of Rio Grande do Norte in the Northeast region of Brazil. 

São Miguel do Gostoso was founded on 29 September 1884.

History 
On 16 July 1993, the beachfront town of São Miguel split from the municipality of Touros. The new municipality, São Miguel do Gostoso, held its first elections in 1996 and at this time it was decided that the town would retain its original name of São Miguel de Touros. 

On 19 November 2000, a local referendum was held and voters decided to change the town's name  to São Miguel do Gostoso.

Name origin 
According to legend, a town resident, Manoel Gostoso, provided accommodations to traveling salesmen.  Gostoso became known for entertaining his guests with stories and jokes. The locals soon began to refer to the town as Gostoso, in honor of Manoel. 

On 29 September 1899, Miguel Félix Martins built the first Roman Catholic first church in town, in honor of Saint Michaell. The locals then joined São Miguel to the previous name of Gostoso to create São Miguel do Gostoso.

Access 
São Miguel do Gostoso was accessible only by horseback, due to a lack of roads. In the 1960s the  BR-101 and RN-221 (Project Pólo Costa das Dunas) roads were constructed to improve the access to Natal.. 

In the past the town houses were constructed mainly of "taipa" but are today mostly constructed in bricks and cement.

Tourism 
In 1989, the city only had one Pousada (local Bed & Breakfast). Today São Miguel do Gostoso has approximately 25 Pousadas, a variation of bars and restaurants and two kite and wind surf schools. The wind conditions attract many visitors for kite surfing and windsurfing

The municipality, in partnership with EMBRATUR, opened the São Miguel do Gostoso Tourist Office.

General information 
 Size: 345.9 km² (equivalent to 0.65% of the state of Rio Grande do Norte)
 Rain: Average 1038.3 mm 
 Rainy Season: March to June
 Average Annual Temperature: 26,5 °C
 Average Annual Humidity: 68% 
 Population: Approximately 10.000 inhabitants
 Economy: Tourism, Agriculture and Fishing
 Electricity: 220 V
 High speed internet: Yes
 Cell phone coverage: Yes

See also
List of municipalities in Rio Grande do Norte

References

Municipalities in Rio Grande do Norte
Populated coastal places in Rio Grande do Norte